Jarrett Rufus Deuling (born March 4, 1974 in Vernon, British Columbia) is a Canadian retired professional ice hockey player. He played in 15 games for the New York Islanders during the 1995–96 and 1996–97 seasons. The rest of his career, which lasted from 1994 to 2001, was mainly spent in the minor American Hockey League.

Playing career
Deuling played junior hockey with the Kamloops Blazers of the Western Hockey League for four seasons. After being drafted by the NHL's New York Islanders, Jarrett reported to New York's AHL franchise, the Worcester IceCats. He played a full season with Worcester before starting off next year with the Islanders. He played in only 14 games and was quickly sent back down to the IceCats. He finished off the season in the AHL, and again, started the next season with the Islanders. This time Deuling played in only one game for New York before being sent down to the Islanders new AHL affiliate, the Kentucky Thoroughblades. He played a full season in Kentucky before moving on to the International Hockey League, where he played for the Milwaukee Admirals. Deuling played a full season in Milwaukee before returning to the Thoroughblades, now a farm team of the San Jose Sharks, where he finished off his career with three seasons before retiring.

Deuling is the cousin of Rob and Scott Niedermayer.

Career statistics

Regular season and playoffs

External links
 

1974 births
Living people
Canadian ice hockey left wingers
Ice hockey people from British Columbia
Kamloops Blazers players
Kentucky Thoroughblades players
Milwaukee Admirals (IHL) players
New York Islanders draft picks
New York Islanders players
Sportspeople from Vernon, British Columbia
Worcester IceCats players